CONVIVIR, an acronym for Servicios Especiales de Vigilancia y Seguridad Privada (English: Special Vigilance and Private Security Services) (the word to which the acronym owes its namesake, “convivir”, means "living in harmony" in Spanish) was a national program of cooperative neighbourhood watch groups created by a February 11, 1994 decree of Colombia's Ministry of National Defense and a law passed in the Colombian Congress, in response to growing guerrilla activity. Authorized during the government of César Gaviria but mainly developed during the administration of Ernesto Samper (1994-1998), the CONVIVIR groups quickly became controversial as it was considered to represent something of a revival of the Law 48 of 1968.

Members of some former paramilitary groups transitioned into CONVIVIR, where they were joined by newer recruits and victims of guerrilla aggression, while others, such as the ACCU, remained operating independently. The then governor of Antioquia, Álvaro Uribe Velez (who later became President of Colombia), whose father had been killed by the FARC during a kidnapping attempt in 1983, gained notoriety for his open support and promotion of the CONVIVIR at the time.

Reports argued that some CONVIVIR groups achieved results in providing security to communities and intelligence coordination to military forces, but apparently numerous members committed abuses against civilians, without a serious oversight over their operations and organization. In 1998, HRW stated that "we have received credible information that indicated that the CONVIVIR groups of the Middle Magdalena and of the southern Cesar regions were directed by known paramilitaries and had threatened to assassinate Colombians that were considered as guerrilla sympathizers or which rejected joining the cooperative groups".

After much political debate, a November 1997 decision of Colombia's Constitutional Court stated that CONVIVIR members could not gather intelligence information and could not employ military grade weapons. Other restrictions included increasing legal supervision, and in early 1998 dozens of former CONVIVIR groups had their licenses revoked, because they did not turn in their weapons and withheld information about their personnel. Due to these measures, some gradually turned in their weapons and phased themselves out. 237 of the restricted weapons were returned to authorities by the end of 1997. Other members did not comply and later joined existing paramilitary groups.

According to a 2007 U.S. indictment against the Chiquita Brands International fruit company, a number of payments to the United Self-Defense Forces of Colombia passed through an "intermediary" Convivir group which operated in the Urabá region.

In popular culture
 Narcos Season 3, Episode 8: "Convivir"
 Narcos (TV Series 2015–2017)

References

History of Colombia
Anti-communist organizations
Anti-communist terrorism